Robert Rees Summerhays (born September 10, 1965) is a United States district judge of the United States District Court for the Western District of Louisiana. He was formerly a United States Bankruptcy Judge of the same court.

Biography 

Summerhays earned his Bachelor of Arts, with high honors, from the University of Texas at Austin, where he was inducted into Phi Beta Kappa, and his Juris Doctor from the University of Texas School of Law, where he graduated with high honors and was inducted into the Order of the Coif.

Upon graduation from law school, he served as a law clerk to Judge W. Eugene Davis of the United States Court of Appeals for the Fifth Circuit. He was a partner in the Dallas office of Weil, Gotshal & Manges before becoming a bankruptcy judge.

He joined the Federalist Society in 2016.

Federal judicial service

Bankruptcy court service 

Summerhays became a judge of the United States Bankruptcy Court for the Western District of Louisiana in 2006 and served on that court until becoming a district judge. He was chief judge of that court from 2009 to 2017.

District court service 

On January 23, 2018, President Donald Trump announced his intent to nominate Summerhays to an undetermined seat on the United States District Court for the Western District of Louisiana. On January 24, 2018, his nomination was sent to the United States Senate. He was nominated to the seat vacated by Judge Rebecca F. Doherty, who assumed senior status on June 5, 2017. On April 11, 2018, a hearing on his nomination was held before the Senate Judiciary Committee. On May 10, 2018, his nomination was reported out of committee by a voice vote. On September 6, 2018, his nomination was confirmed by a voice vote. He received his judicial commission on September 19, 2018.

References

External links 
 
 

1965 births
Living people
20th-century American lawyers
21st-century American lawyers
21st-century American judges
Federalist Society members
Judges of the United States bankruptcy courts
Judges of the United States District Court for the Western District of Louisiana
Louisiana lawyers
Louisiana Republicans
People from Fort Worth, Texas
Texas lawyers
Texas Republicans
United States district court judges appointed by Donald Trump
University of Texas School of Law alumni